Gil Duran was the California opinion editor for The Sacramento Bee and the former press secretary for California governor Jerry Brown. 

Duran was previously communications director for U.S. Senator Dianne Feinstein, from 2008 to 2010. He was also press secretary to Los Angeles Mayor Antonio Villaraigosa from 2007 to 2008. 

In 2018, Duran was named the California opinion editor for The Sacramento Bee and oversees strategy for McClatchy's five California news organizations: The Sacramento Bee, The Fresno Bee, The Modesto Bee, The Merced Sun-Star and The Tribune in San Luis Obispo.

Personal life
Duran attended Paul Laurence Dunbar High School in Lexington, Kentucky, and DePauw University in Greencastle, Indiana. He was profiled in Esquire magazine speaking about his mother.

References

External links
Office of the Governor of California
CA.gov Press Release

American public relations people
Living people
Year of birth missing (living people)
American columnists
American male journalists
People from Lexington, Kentucky